The Mount Olive Village Historic District is a historic district located along Mount Olive Road and Flanders-Drakestown Road in the Mount Olive Village section of Mount Olive Township, Morris County, New Jersey. The district was added to the National Register of Historic Places on August 3, 2015. The district includes the Mount Olive Baptist Church and Schoolhouse.

Gallery

See also
National Register of Historic Places listings in Morris County, New Jersey

References

External links
 

Mount Olive Township, New Jersey
National Register of Historic Places in Morris County, New Jersey
Historic districts on the National Register of Historic Places in New Jersey
New Jersey Register of Historic Places